Emarat (also Romanized as ‘Emārat and ‘Emāret; also known as ‘Emārat-e Mollā-ye Anār, Imārat, and Mollā Anār) is a village in Khesht Rural District, Khesht District, Kazerun County, Fars Province, Iran. At the 2006 census, its population was 62, in 15 families.

References 

Populated places in Kazerun County